Shemaryahu Gurary, also known by his Hebrew initials as Rashag, (1897-1989) was a rabbi following the Chabad-Lubavitch dynasty of Hasidism. His father was Menachem Mendel Gurary. He was a son-in-law of Yosef Yitzchok Schneersohn, the sixth Chabad-Lubavitch rebbe, and the brother-in-law of Menachem Mendel Schneerson, the seventh. He worked with his father-in-law in Russia and Poland and moved to the U.S. in 1940.

Biography 
He was the director in Warsaw of the Tomchei Temimim yeshiva network.

Upon the death of his father-in-law in 1950, he was considered as a possible successor to him but soon ceded his position to his brother-in-law Menachem Mendel Scheerson.

Gurary's son Barry Gurary had disputes with the Chabad-Lubavitch dynasty.

Footnotes

References
Avrum M. Ehrlich, Messiah of Brooklyn: Understanding Lubavitch Hasidism Past and Present
Avrum M. Ehrlich, Leadership in the HaBaD Movement 
Shaul Shimon Deutsch, Larger than Life

External links
Passing of the Rashag

1897 births
1989 deaths
Chabad-Lubavitch rabbis
Yosef Yitzchak Schneersohn